The Best of Sammy Hagar is the name of two albums:

The Best of Sammy Hagar (1992 album)
The Best of Sammy Hagar (1999 album)